Line 5 is an underground rapid transit line in Milan, Italy, part of the Milan Metro.
It opened in stages between 2013 and 2015.

The line operates using AnsaldoBreda Driverless Metro vehicles.

Route
It runs from Bignami to the north of the city to San Siro Stadio to the south-west in less than 26 minutes.

Map

Operation

The line is equipped with a third-rail power supply at a voltage of 750 V in direct current. It is the first line in Milan with a fully automatic management and driving system, as well as the first to have platform screen doors. The entire line is controlled and managed by a single control centre, located at the depot at the Bignami terminus. The line is connected to the rest of the network by a track between Isola and Garibaldi FS  stations, which allows trains to reach the M2 line and then the Precotto depot on the M1 line, the closest one that is able to carry out repairs.

However, thanks to very high frequencies the passenger capacity is high at 24,000 passengers per hour. 
Although the complete automation allows a maximum frequency of one train every 90 seconds (75 in some cases), the current maximum frequency is 150 seconds due to the limited number of trains available.

Management
The company responsible for construction works and operation is Metro 5 S.p.A., a consortium of: 
 Ansaldo STS (24.6%)
 Astaldi (23.3%)
 Azienda Trasporti Milanesi (20.0%)
 Torno Global Contracting (15.4%)
 Alstom (9.4%)
 AnsaldoBreda (7.3%)

Metro 5 covered 40% of global construction costs, and will operate the line for 27 years from the opening.

Rolling stock

The line uses 21 four-car articulated driverless trains from AnsaldoBreda (now Hitachi Rail Italy), part of the AnsaldoBreda Driverless Metro system.

The systems are controlled by a fully automated computer system, located at the control and maintenance center.

Future extensions
A northern extension from Bignami to Monza has been approved. It will consist of 11 new stations and the opening is foreseen in 2027.

See also
 Medium-capacity rail transport system

References

External links

Metro5 – official website
Azienda Trasporti Milanesi 
News about Milan Metro 5

5
Railway lines opened in 2013